Collagen alpha-2(I) chain is a protein that in humans is encoded by the COL1A2 gene.

This gene encodes one of the chains for type I collagen, the fibrillar collagen found in most connective tissues. Mutations in this gene are associated with osteogenesis imperfecta, Cardiac-valvular, and Arthrochlasia type Ehlers-Danlos syndrome, idiopathic osteoporosis, and atypical Marfan syndrome. Symptoms associated with mutations in this gene, however, tend to be less severe than mutations in the gene for alpha-1 type I collagen, since alpha-2 is less abundant. Multiple messages for this gene result from multiple polyadenylation signals, a feature shared by most of the other collagen genes.

See also
 Type-I collagen
 Collagen

References

Further reading

External links
  GeneReviews/NCBI/NIH/UW entry on Osteogenesis Imperfecta

Collagens